The 2015–16 Liga Națională season was the 66th season of the Liga Națională, the highest professional basketball league in Romania. CSM U Oradea won its first national championship this season.

Teams

Defending champion Asesoft Ploiești left the league due to its financial trouble to play in the first league. Meanwhile, Universitatea Cluj and Timba Timișoara were relegated to the Liga I as last qualified teams of the previous season. Dinamo București and Phoenix Galați promoted as champions and runners-up from the 2014–15 Liga I season.

Regular season

Play-offs

References

External links
Official site of the Romanian Basketball Federation
Halfcourt.info (Romanian and English)
Numaibaschet.ro (Romanian)
Baschetromania.ro (Romanian)

2016-17
Romanian
Lea